Anne Duk Hee Jordan is a Korean-German artist, born in Korea in 1978. She lives and works in Berlin, Germany.

Early life and education 
Anne Duk Hee Jordan, an orphan from Korea, was adopted by a German couple at the age of four, and grew up in a small village in West Germany. She was trained as a Rescue Diver, deep sea diver, and free diver. She was also trained as an occupational therapist, specializing in Kinaesthetics. She started her art education at 27, when she enrolled at the Berlin Weissensee. Disappointed by the program after several of her professors left the school, she joined Olafur Eliason’s Institute for Spatial Experience in 2012 as a master student.

Career 
Anne Duk Hee Jordan's background shaped her interests in art, science, and philosophy. Her work often speaks of issues of migration, identity, and social spaces, using natural or biological processes as metaphors. Her installations are meticulously researched, and she often uses humor to get her point across. She uses both living and dead materials, at times constructing machines that can mirror organisms, and creates a dialogue between art and science, her identity and social systems.

Major works 

 Mein Deutsches Herz / My German Heart (2009): identifying herself with the ubiquitous potato in Germany (a plant from "elsewhere" introduced to Europe) the artist installed a small motor in a gutted potato, which was painted red, animating it like a beating heart. The work was a metaphor for her life: she comes from a place she cannot remember, and now lives in a "destination she does not know".
 Water Me / Eat Me (2009): a self-sustained laboratory, where the artists not only "fed" a potato field with her own blood thereby mixing their DNA, but where the potatoes also acted as a source of energy for watering the plants, through a series of wires attached to copper and zinc plates, placed inside the potatoes.
 Metrotopie (2011): Anne Duk Hee Jordan collaborated with Shira Wachsmann, which took a subway car filled with living plants from all over the world that traveled across Berlin. The train car acted as a symbol of energy, recalling the Chinese meridian system (qi).
 Lost Princess of Mongolia, Icarus (2012): in this video installation, the artist interweaves images of herself, dressed in traditional Mongolian dress wandering the streets of Berlin, with images of the artist preparing food (washing lettuce, peeling potatoes, etc.). Dealing with issues of identity, the video ends with Anne throwing the potato into a river, symbolizing her return to her origin across the ocean.
 Ziggy and the Starfish—How one becomes One with a Fish (2016/18): the artist investigates the sexuality of marine life, and the effect of climate change on its adapting and changing sexual behavior.
 Into The Wild (2017–18): dinner parties where up to 100 guests eat seasonal plants that grow in the city of Berlin. No utensils are provided and the table itself is edible.
 ‘’ I travelled 1.8 million Years to be With You" (2018): public sculpture for Beaufort Triennial, Ostend, Belgium. The work shows a huge boulder stone seemingly hanging in a fishing net in between two buoys.

Solo exhibitions 

 2020  A Handful of Dust with Viron Erol Vert, Berlin 
 2020  Into the Wild / Unter Beobachtung. Kunst des Rückzugs in collaboration with Dr. Hauschka / WALA, Kultur Region Stuttgart
 2019  Ziggy goes Wild, Kunstverein Arnsberg
 2019  Staying with the Trouble from Donna Haraway, Zitadelle Spandau, Berlin
 2018  Ziggy on the Land of Drunken Trees, Galerie Wedding, Berlin
 2017  Into the Wild, Food Art Week, Berlin
 2016  Entanglement of Little Things, Balzer Projects, Basel, Switzerland
 2016 Sonntag, Berlin
 2015 Städtische Galerie, Iserlohen
 2015  Far from any Road with Ralf Teekat, NON Berlin
 2014  OF bodies changed to various forms, I sing, Galerie cubus-m, Berlin
 2012  Das Lied der Leere, Museum für angewandte Kunst, Frankfurt
 2011  IF hope exists...there is no wasted land, Galerie cubus-m, Berlin
 2011  Metrotopie, Haus der Kulturen der Welt, Berlin
 2010  Compassion, UdK, Berlin
 2010 Update Art 2010, Artforum, Berlin 
 2010 Impulse, Munich

Awards 
Anne Duk Hee Jordan received first place in 2005 for her poetry in the Brentano Literature Contest. Her work was compiled in the Bibliothek Deutschsprachiger Gedichte in 2008 and 2012. In 2011, she received a science and art grant from Künstlerdorf Schöppingen. She was an artist in residence at Taipei Artist Village in Taiwan in 2008, at the Flux Factory in New York City in 2012–13, and at "Agency of Living Organism“ in Tabakalera, Spain in 2016. In 2018, her work was included in the Riga International Biennal in Latvia, and the Beaufort Triennale in Ostend, Belgium. She was nominated for the Hector award in 2019 and is in 2020 nominated for the Kunstpreis der Böttcherstrasse in Bremen.The “Prize of the Böttcherstraße in Bremen" is among the leading and highest awards in the field of contemporary art in Germany, Austria and Switzerland.

Press and publications 
Anne Duk Hee Jordan was featured in Sculpture magazine (July/August 2019 issue), and was interviewed in Collectors Agenda by Chrischa Oswald. Her work was reviewed by Alison Hugill for Berlin Art Link. Her work was mentioned in Artforum, as part of the Riga International Biennial of Contemporary Art.

She contributed to Olafur Eliasson's Take Your Time 5 kitchen book (2013) and The Kitchen (2016).

References 

Living people
1978 births
Korean artists
German artists
21st-century German artists
21st-century German women artists